Fernando María Guerrero Ramírez (May 30, 1873 – June 12, 1929) was a Spanish Filipino, poet, journalist, lawyer, politician, and polyglot who became a significant figure during the Philippines' golden period of Spanish literature, a period ranging from 1890 to the outbreak of World War II in 1940.

Biography
Guerrero was born to a highly educated family. His father was Lorenzo Guerrero, a painter and art teacher largely known for mentoring gifted artists like Juan Luna, Felix Hidalgo, and Juan Arellano. His mother was Clamencia Ramirez. He began writing literature at a young age. He excelled in the facility of language and obtained his Bachelor of Arts degree from the Ateneo Municipal de Manila and the Bachelor of Laws degree at the University of Santo Tomas and wrote journals during the years 1898 to 1900. He became a lawyer and he taught criminology and forensic oratory. He served as chairman of the board of study at the law school La Jurisprudencia (The Jurisprudence). He also became a councilor, secretary of the senate and secretary of the Philippine Independence commission. He was also a director of the Academia de Leyes (Academy of Regulation). Apart from Spanish, Guerrero spoke Tagalog, Latin, Greek, and English.

During the revolution he was recruited by General Antonio Luna to serve as contributor and editor for the newspaper, La Indepencia, together with Rafael Palma and Epifanio de los Santos. During the early years of the American occupation, he would be reunited with Rafael Palma at El Renacimiento (The Rebirth), a Spanish-language daily. In a few years, he would transition from the position of editor to director. Under Guerrero's leadership as its director, El Renaciemento would become the most influential and powerful paper in the Philippines—exposing and speaking against the oppression and brutality of the constabulary.

After a brief stint in politics he became an editor at La Vanguardia (The Outer works) and La Opinion (The Opinion). He was a member of the First Philippine Assembly representing Manila's 2nd district, the Academia Filipina (Philippine Academy) and also became a leader of the Municipal Board of Manila. He was also a correspondent to the Royal Academy of the Spanish Language in Madrid. His poetry book Crisálidas was published in 1914. Subsequently, he published another verse compilation called Aves y Flores. Guerrero died on June 12, 1929, coinciding with that year's anniversary of the República Filipina (Philippine Republic). A school in Paco, Manila, was named after him in his honor.

Poetry
A 1913 poem written by Guerrero:

Original in Spanish

English translation

See also
Lourdes Castrillo Brillantes
José Rizal
Ilustrado

References

External links 
  Fernando María Guerrero - A Colossus in Philippine Spanish Literature

1873 births
1929 deaths
People from Ermita
Filipino writers
19th-century Filipino lawyers
Members of the House of Representatives of the Philippines from Manila
Manila City Council members
Fernando Maria
University of Santo Tomas alumni
Ateneo de Manila University alumni
Members of the Philippine Legislature
Filipino newspaper editors
Filipino newspaper executives